The 2016–17 Segunda División Femenina de Fútbol was the 2016–17 edition of the Spanish women's football second-tier league.

Competition format
The Segunda División was divided into seven regional groups. Each group played their season as home and away round-robin format. At the end of the season, the lowest three teams from each regional group (except Group 6) were relegated to regional leagues. The seven group champions (for group 6, the winner of the Canarian final) qualified for the promotion playoffs.

In the promotion playoffs, the seven teams were be divided by draw into two groups: one of four teams and other one of three. The group of four teams played a double-leg knockout format, while the group of three teams played with a double-legged round-robin format. The two group winners, Madrid CFF and Sevilla FC, were promoted to the Primera División.

Group 1

Group 2

Group 3

Group 4

Group 5

Group 6

Las Palmas Group

Tenerife Group

Canarian final
The winner of the Canarian final qualified to the promotion stage.

Group 7

Promotion playoffs
The groups will be drawn on 8 May 2017, at the headquarters of the Royal Spanish Football Federation.

Four-team group

Three-team group

References

External links

Spa
2
Women2
Segunda División (women) seasons